Cəmcəmli (also, Cəm-Cəmli and Dzhamdzhamly) is a village and municipality in the Gobustan Rayon of Azerbaijan.  It has a population of 1,132.  The municipality consists of the villages of Cəmcəmli and Damlamaca.

References 

Populated places in Gobustan District